Interstate 176 (I-176) is a spur route of eastern I-76 in Berks County, Pennsylvania. The highway was originally known as Interstate 180 (I-180) or the "Reading Spur" when the Pennsylvania Turnpike was part of I-80S but was redesignated to its present-day number in 1964 when I-80S became I-76.

Route description

I-176 begins at the Morgantown interchange with I-76 (Pennsylvania Turnpike) near the community of Morgantown in Caernarvon Township, Berks County. The highway heads north from the trumpet interchange through the toll plaza and continues north as a four-lane freeway called the Morgantown Expressway, coming to an interchange with Pennsylvania Route 10 (PA 10) that provides access to Morgantown to the south. At this interchange, the freeway turns to the west, with a southbound runaway truck ramp just past the southbound exit ramp for PA 10. I-176 heads into the borough of New Morgan and runs through forested areas. The road comes to a southbound exit and northbound entrance with State Route 2089 (SR 2089), a four-lane freeway that heads south to an intersection with PA 10/PA 23 in Morgantown. This used to be I-176's old alignment before it was realigned between that point and its current terminus at the Turnpike. At this point, the freeway curves to the northwest and forms the border between Caernarvon Township to the west and New Morgan to the east, passing through wooded surroundings as it heads to the west of a landfill. The route turns north and becomes the border between Robeson Township to the west and New Morgan to the east, before fully entering Robeson Township as it continues through forests. I-176 runs through wooded areas with some farm fields, passing over Allegheny Creek and PA 568 before it comes to a northbound exit and entrance with the parallel PA 10 to the east in Green Hills. From here, the freeway continues through woodland with nearby development and passes over PA 10 prior to entering Cumru Township and coming to a southbound exit and entrance connecting to PA 10 to the west. The road heads north-northeast through forested hills, curving to the north. The route reaches a diamond interchange with PA 724 and passes over Norfolk Southern Railway's Harrisburg Line #1 and the Schuylkill River Trail as it heads west of industrial areas. I-176 reaches its northern terminus at a trumpet interchange with the US 422 freeway southeast of the city of Reading.

History

Prior to 1996, motorists wanting to get to I-176 from the Pennsylvania Turnpike (I-76) had to travel through Morgantown on PA 10 and then enter I-176 northbound to Reading at a traffic light, similar to that found on I-70 in Breezewood. Since 1996, a replacement Pennsylvania Turnpike interchange and a new stretch of I-176 have eliminated the need to travel through Morgantown, with the old section, now a spur numbered SR 2089, still maintained as ramps leading to and from exit 2. The entire highway, except for the new direct connection, has a  speed limit.

In May 2018, I-176 was dedicated as the Vietnam War Veterans Memorial Highway, the Persian Gulf War Veterans Memorial Highway, and the Iraq and Afghanistan War Veterans Memorial Highway in honor of veterans from the Vietnam War, Persian Gulf War, Iraq War, and War in Afghanistan.

Exit list

See also

 List of auxiliary Interstate Highways
 List of Interstate Highways in Pennsylvania

References

External links

 I-176 on Kurumi.com
 Interstate Guide - I-176
 Pennsylvania Highways: I-176
 I-176 at AARoads.com

76-1
76-1
1
Transportation in Berks County, Pennsylvania